Amanda Douge (born December 1976) is an Australian actress, best known from a range of television and feature film roles.

Douge studied law at Melbourne University (1993) and has been with the Melbourne Theatre Company.

She has played Becky Gallagher, the mentally ill twin sister of Dr. Jack Gallagher on the FOX drama Mental.

Filmography

Film

Television

Awards

Wins
1995 Australian Film Institute Award, for That Eye, the Sky

References

External links

Australian film actresses
Australian television actresses
Actresses from Melbourne
Living people
1976 births
Best Supporting Actress AACTA Award winners